This is a list of male cricketers who have played for New South Wales in first-class, List A and Twenty20 cricket. It is complete to the end of the 2017–18 season. The list refers to the sides named as "New South Wales" and does not include players who have appeared for the Sydney-based T20 sides unless they have appeared also in games under the NSW name.

Players are listed in alphabetical order.

A 
Sean Abbott (2010–11 to date) : S. A. Abbott
Claude Achurch (1921–22) : C. S. Achurch
Ted Adams (1919–20) : E. W. Adams
Francis Adams (1858–59) : F. Adams
Warwick Adlam (1993–94 to 1996–97) : W. J. Adlam
Henry Allan (1871–72) : H. A. Allan
Reginald Allen (1878–79 to 1887–88) : R. C. Allen
Phil Alley (1990–91 to 1997–98) : P. J. S. Alley
Bill Alley (1945–46 to 1947–48) : W. E. Alley
John Alleyne (1927–28) : J. P. Alleyne
Arthur Allsopp (1929–30 to 1930–31) : A. H. Allsopp
Gordon Amos (1926–27 to 1931–32) : G. S. Amos
Allan Anderson (1971–72 to 1972–73) : A. D. Anderson
Peter Anderson (1966–67) : P. G. Anderson
Tommy Andrews (1912–13 to 1928–29) : T. J. E. Andrews
Cassie Andrews (1928–29 to 1930–31) : W. C. Andrews
Tim Armstrong (2010–11) : T. J. Armstrong
Jason Arnberger (1994–95 to 1996–97) : J. L. Arnberger
Percival Arnott (1911–12 to 1912–13) : P. S. Arnott
Oswald Asher (1919–20 to 1925–26) : O. P. Asher
Albert Atkins (1896–97) : A. Atkins
Sydney Austin (1892–93 to 1893–94) : S. W. Austin

B 
Charlie Baker (1968–69) : C. R. Baker
Alick Bannerman (1876–77 to 1893–94) : A. C. Bannerman
Charles Bannerman (1870–71 to 1887–88) : C. Bannerman
Eric Barbour (1908–09 to 1914–15) : E. P. Barbour
Mick Bardsley (1920–21 to 1925–26) : R. Bardsley
Warren Bardsley (1903–04 to 1925–26) : W. Bardsley 
Charles Barnes (1904–05 to 1912–13) : J. C. Barnes
Sid Barnes (1936–37 to 1952–53) : S. G. Barnes
Barry Bates (1959–60 to 1960–61) : B. Bates
Trevor Bayliss (1985–86 to 1996–97) : T. H. Bayliss
James Beal (1855–56) : J. C. Beal
Graeme Beard (1975–76 to 1981–82) : G. R. Beard
Bill Beath (1946–47 to 1947–48) : N. R. J. Beath
Chris Beatty (1977–78 to 1978–79) : C. Beatty
Reg Beatty (1936–37) : R. G. Beatty
John Beeston (1857–58 to 1860–61) : J. L. Beeston
Samuel Belcher (1866–67) : S. H. Belcher
John Benaud (1966–67 to 1972–73) : J. Benaud
Richie Benaud (1948–49 to 1963–64) : R. Benaud
Albert Bennett (1930–31) : A. Bennett
George Bennett (1933–34) : G. H. Bennett
Murray Bennett (1982–83 to 1987–88) : M. J. Bennett
Gary Bensley (1981–82 to 1983–84) : G. R. Bensley
Steve Bernard (1970–71 to 1978–79) : S. R. Bernard
Edward Berrie (1913–14) : E. B. Berrie
Lyall Berry (1918–19 to 1919–20) : W. L. Berry
Leslie Best (1914–15) : L. Best
John Bettington (1927–28) : B. C. J. Bettington
Reg Bettington (1928–29 to 1931–32) : R. H. B. Bettington
Michael Bevan (1990–91 to 2003–04) : M. G. Bevan
Wendell Bill (1929–30 to 1934–35) : O. W. Bill
Nicholas Bills (2010–11) : N. D. Bills
Aaron Bird (2005–06 to 2009–10) : A. C. Bird
Gordon Black (1903–04) : G. G. Black
Colin Blackman (1966–67 to 1968–69) : O. C. Blackman
Marcus Blaxland (1903–04 to 1907–08) : M. H. Blaxland
Phillip Blizzard (1985–86) : P. A. Blizzard
James Bogle (1918–19 to 1920–21) : J. Bogle
Doug Bollinger (2002–03 to date) : D. E. Bollinger
George Bonnor (1884–85 to 1890–91) : G. J. Bonnor
Brian Booth (1954–55 to 1968–69) : B. C. Booth
Allan Border (1976–77 to 1979–80) : A. R. Border
Marcus Bosley (1924–25) : M. W. Bosley
Albert Bowden (1899–1900 to 1907–08) : A. J. Bowden
Rod Bower (1983–84 to 1986–87) : R. J. Bower
Raymond Boyce (1921–22) : R. C. M. Boyce
Trevor Boyd (1966–67 to 1969–70) : T. J. Boyd
Nathan Bracken (1998–99 to 2009–10) : N. W. Bracken
Donald Bradman (1927–28 to 1933–34) : D. G. Bradman
Sidney Bradridge (1855–56) : J. S. Bradridge
Shawn Bradstreet (1998–99 to 2004–05) : S. D. Bradstreet
Jeremy Bray (1997–98) : J. P. Bray
Robert Brewster (1893–94) : R. C. Brewster
Ron Briggs (1952–53 to 1954–55) : R. E. Briggs
Tom Brooks (1946–47 to 1952–53) : T. F. Brooks
Edward Brown (1859–60) : E. Brown
Edward Brown (1920–21) : E. K. F. Brown
Bill Brown (1932–33 to 1934–35) : W. A. Brown
Fairfax Brown (1919–20 to 1925–26) : W. G. F. Brown
Richard Bryant (1882–83 to 1884–85) : R. Bryant
Ernest Bubb (1905–06 to 1908–09) : E. R. Bubb
Roy Bubb (1924–25) : R. A. R. Bubb
Sandy Buckle (1913–14) : F. Buckle
Eric Bull (1913–14 to 1914–15) : E. A. Bull
Jarrad Burke (2005–06) : J. N. Burke
Jim Burke (1948–49 to 1958–59) : J. W. Burke
J. Burrows (1877–78) : J. Burrows
Selby Burt (1928–29 to 1929–30) : S. J. W. Burt
Frederick Burton (1885–86 to 1895–96) : F. J. Burton

C 
Billy Caffyn (1865–66 to 1870–71) : W. Caffyn
Tim Caldwell (1935–36 to 1936–37) : T. C. J. Caldwell
John Callachor (1882–83) : J. J. C. Callachor
Norman Callaway (1914–15) : N. F. Callaway
Sydney Callaway (1888–89 to 1895–96) : S. T. Callaway
Mark Cameron (2002–03 to 2010–11) : M. A. Cameron
Norval Campbell (1926–27 to 1934–35) : J. N. Campbell
Leslie Campbell (1925–26) : L. P. Campbell
William Camphin (1892–93 to 1894–95) : W. J. Camphin
Roy Campling (1922–23) : C. R. Campling
Keith Carmody (1939–40 to 1946–47) : D. K. Carmody
Sid Carroll (1945–46 to 1958–59) : S. J. Carroll
Sammy Carter (1897–98 to 1924–25) : H. Carter
Jack Carter (1928–29) : W. J. S. Carter
Ryan Carters (2013–14 to 2016–17) : R. G. L. Carters
Beau Casson (2006–07 to 2011–12) : B. Casson
George Chapman (1924–25) : G. A. N. Chapman
Ross Chapman (1972–73) : R. A. Chapman
Trevor Chappell (1979–80 to 1985–86) : T. M. Chappell
Dave Chardon (1975–76) : D. M. Chardon
Percie Charlton (1888–89 to 1897–98) : P. C. Charlton
Richard Chee Quee (1992–93 to 1997–1998) : R. Chee Quee
Albert Cheetham (1936–37 to 1939–40) : A. G. Cheetham
Jack Chegwyn (1940–41 to 1941–42) : J. W. Chegwyn
Hugh Chilvers (1929–30 to 1936–37) : H. C. Chilvers
Arthur Chipperfield (1933–34 to 1939–40) : A. G. Chipperfield
Daniel Christian (2005–06 to 2006–07) : D. T. Christian
Anthony Clark (2000–01 to 2001–02) : A. M. Clark
John Clark (1953–54) : J. L. Clark
Stuart Clark (1997–98 to 2010–11) : S. R. Clark
Alfred Clarke (1889–90 to 1891–92) : A. E. Clarke
Gother Clarke (1899–1900 to 1901–02) : G. R. C. Clarke
John Clarke (1859–60 to 1862–63) : J. T. Clarke
Michael Clarke (1999–2000 to 2013–14) : M. J. Clarke
James Cleeve (1882–83 to 1883–84) : J. O. Cleeve
Mark Clews (1976–77 to 1978–79) : M. L. Clews
Peter Clifford (1983–84 to 1985–86) : P. S. Clifford
Joseph Coates (1867–68 to 1879–80) : J. Coates
Thomas Cobcroft (1895–96) : L. T. Cobcroft
Burt Cockley (2007–08 to 2009–10) : B. T. Cockley
Leslie Cody (1912–13 to 1913–14) : L. A. Cody
Morton Cohen (1939–40 to 1940–41) : M. B. Cohen
David Colley (1969–70 to 1977–78) : D. J. Colley
Herbie Collins (1909–10 to 1925–26) : H. L. Collins
Ross Collins (1967–68 to 1975–76) : R. P. Collins
Vincent Collins (1941–42 to 1947–48) : V. A. Collins
Bernard Colreavy (1899–1900) : B. X. Colreavy
Arthur Coningham (1892–93 to 1898–99) : A. Coningham
Thomas Connell (1896–97) : T. W. C. Connell
Harry Conway (2015–16 to date) : H. N. A. Conway
Bruce Cook (1940–41) : B. Cook
Simon Cook (1995–96 to 2000–01) : S. H. Cook
Allan Cooper (1935–36) : A. F. Cooper
Bryce Cooper (1928–29 to 1929–30) : B. A. Cooper
Trent Copeland (2009–10 to date) : T. A. Copeland
Grahame Corling (1963–64 to 1968–69) : G. E. Corling
Sam Cosstick (1865–66) : S. Cosstick
John Cottam (1886–87 to 1889–90) : J. T. Cottam
Tibby Cotter (1901–02 to 1913–14) : A. Cotter
Ted Cotton (1952–53 to 1954–55) : E. K. Cotton
Ed Cowan (2004–05 to date) : E. J. M. Cowan
Owen Cowley (1893–94) : O. W. Cowley
George Cowper (1888–89 to 1889–90) : G. L. Cowper
Scott Coyte (2006–07 to 2011–12) : S. J. Coyte
Ian Craig (1951–52 to 1961–62) : I. D. Craig
Mason Crane (2016–17) : M. S. Crane
Mudgee Cranney (1909–10 to 1921–22) : H. Cranney
Pat Crawford (1954–55 to 1957–58) : W. P. A. Crawford
Ron Crippin (1970–71 to 1978–79) : R. J. Crippin
Bob Cristofani (1941–42 to 1946–47) : D. R. Cristofani
Ernie Crossan (1937–38 to 1945–46) : E. E. Crossan
Tim Cruickshank (2010–11 to 2012–13) : T. D. Cruickshank
John Cuffe (1902–03) : J. A. Cuffe
Daniel Cullen (1912–13 to 1913–14) : D. R. Cullen
William Cullen (1914–15) : W. Cullen
Frank Cummins (1925–26 to 1932–33) : F. S. Cummins
Pat Cummins (2010–11 to date) : P. J. Cummins
George Curtis (1861–62 to 1865–66) : G. T. Curtis
Norman Cush (1934–35) : N. L. Cush

D 
David D'Arcy (1862–63) : D. D'Arcy
Alan Davidson (1949–50 to 1962–63) : A. K. Davidson
Hugh Davidson (1927–28 to 1930–31) : H. L. Davidson
Geoff Davies (1965–66 to 1971–72) : G. R. Davies
Horrie Davis (1911–12 to 1924–25) : H. H. Davis
Ian Davis (1973–74 to 1982–83) : I. C. Davis
Jonas Davis (1879–80 to 1893–94) : J. J. Davis
Rod Davison (1993–94 to 1999–2000) : R. J. Davison
David Dawson (2011–12 to 2012–13) : D. G. Dawson
Oscar Dean (1907–08) : O. H. Dean
Norman Deane (1902–03 to 1908–09) : N. Y. Deane
Sydney Deane (1889–90) : S. L. Deane
Jim de Courcy (1947–48 to 1957–58) : J. H. de Courcy
Frank Devenish-Meares (1901–02) : F. Devenish-Meares
Austin Diamond (1899–1900 to 1918–19) : A. Diamond
George Dickson (1859–60 to 1871–72) : G. D. Dickson
Percy Dive (1924–25) : P. W. Dive
Arthur Docker (1871–72) : A. R. Docker
Cyril Docker (1909–10) : C. T. Docker
Ernest Docker (1862–63) : E. B. Docker
Keith Docker (1919–20) : K. B. Docker
Phillip Docker (1910–11) : P. W. Docker
Bill Donaldson (1945–46 to 1949–50) : W. P. J. Donaldson
Richard Done (1978–79 to 1985–86) : R. P. Done
Harry Donnan (1887–88 to 1900–01) : H. Donnan
Jim Donnelly (1929–30 to 1931–32) : J. L. Donnelly
Luke Doran (2010–11 to 2012–13) : L. A. Doran
Francis Downes (1881–82 to 1890–91) : F. Downes
Richard Driver (1855–56) : R. Driver
Reggie Duff (1898–99 to 1907–08) : R. A. Duff
Walter Duff (1902–03) : W. S. Duff
Jimmy Dummett (1876–77 to 1877–78) : W. Dummett
Harry Dupain (1927–28 to 1929–30) : F. H. Dupain
Ben Dwarshuis (2016–17) : B. J. Dwarshuis
Chappie Dwyer (1918–19 to 1928–29) : E. A. Dwyer
Greg Dyer (1983–84 to 1988–89) : G. C. Dyer
John Dyson (1975–76 to 1989–90) : J. Dyson

E 
Frank Easton (1933–34 to 1938–39) : F. A. Easton
Ronald Eaton (1928–29) : H. R. Eaton
Norman Ebsworth (1902–03) : N. Ebsworth
Mickey Edwards (2017–18) : M. W. Edwards
Ross Edwards (1979–80) : R. Edwards
Thomas Egan (1924–25) : T. C. W. Egan
Les Ellis (1964–65) : L. G. Ellis
Phil Emery (1987–88 to 1998–99) : P. A. Emery
Sid Emery (1908–09 to 1912–13) : S. H. Emery
Vic Emery (1948–49) : V. R. Emery
Edwin Evans (1874–75 to 1887–88) : E. Evans 
Sam Everett (1921–22 to 1929–30) : C. S. Everett
Harold Evers (1896–97 to 1901–02) : H. A. Evers

F 
Arthur Fagan (1953–54 to 1956–57) : A. M. Fagan
Alan Fairfax (1928–29 to 1931–32) : A. G. Fairfax
Robert Fairweather (1868–69) : R. J. Fairweather
Monty Faithfull (1870–71 to 1874–75) : H. M. Faithfull
Daniel Fallins (2017–18)  D. G. Fallins
Les Fallowfield (1934–35 to 1941–42) : L. J. Fallowfield
Bill Farnsworth (1908–09) : A. W. Farnsworth
Wally Farquhar (1894–95 to 1903–04) : B. W. Farquhar
Frank Farrar (1914–15) : F. M. Farrar
John Ferris (1886–87 to 1897–98) : J. J. Ferris
Jack Fingleton (1928–29 to 1939–40) : J. H. W. Fingleton
Arthur Fisher (1903–04 to 1907–08) : A. D. W. Fisher
Jack Fitzpatrick (1937–38 to 1938–39) : J. H. Fitzpatrick
Ray Flockton (1951–52 to 1962–63) : R. G. Flockton
John Flynn (1914–15) : J. P. Flynn
Bert Folkard (1910–11 to 1920–21) : B. J. Folkard
Doug Ford (1957–58 to 1963–64) : D. A. Ford
Peter Forrest (2006–07 to 2010–11) : P. J. Forrest
Ted Forssberg (1920–21 to 1921–22) : E. E. B. Forssberg
Thomas Foster (1903–04) : T. H. Foster
Norman Fox (1926–27) : N. H. Fox
Bruce Francis (1968–69 to 1972–73) : B. C. Francis
Keith Francis (1957–58) : K. R. Francis
David Freedman (1991–92 to 1998–99) : D. A. Freedman
Arthur Furness (1895–96) : A. J. Furness

G 
Leornard Garnsey (1904–05 to 1906–07) : G. L. Garnsey
Tom Garrett (1876–77 to 1897–98) : T. W. Garrett
Alfred Geary (1877–78 to 1882–83) : A. Geary
Daniel Gee (1903–04 to 1913–14) : D. A. Gee
Greg Geise (1983–84 to 1984–85) : G. G. Geise
Kevin Geyer (1997–98 to 1998–99) : K. J. Geyer
Ryan Gibson (2016–17 to date) : R. J. Gibson
Dave Gilbert (1983–84 to 1987–88) : D. R. Gilbert
George Gilbert (1855–56 to 1874–75) : G. H. B. Gilbert
Adam Gilchrist (1992–93 to 1993–94) : A. C. Gilchrist
Francis Gilmore (1938–39 to 1939–40) : F. P. J. Gilmore
Gary Gilmour (1971–72 to 1979–80) : G. J. Gilmour
Craig Glassock (1994–95 to 1997–98) : C. A. Glassock
John Gleeson (1966–67 to 1972–73) : J. W. Gleeson
Harry Goddard (1905–06 to 1910–11) : H. Goddard
Gordon Goffet (1965–66 to 1968–69) : G. Goffet
Gamini Goonesena (1960–61 to 1963–64) : G. Goonesena
Evan Gordon (1981–82 to 1982–83) : E. S. Gordon
George Gordon (1866–67 to 1867–68) : G. H. Gordon
Froggy Gorman (1862–63) : F. O. Gorman
Charles Gorry (1907–08 to 1910–11) : C. R. Gorry
Reginald Gostelow (1920–21 to 1924–25) : R. E. P. Gostelow
John Gould (1891–92 to 1895–96) : J. W. Gould
Freddy Gow (1909–10 to 1910–11) : F. K. Gow
Paddy Gray (1922–23 to 1924–25) : A. T. Gray
Toby Gray (2022–23 to present)
Chris Green (2014–15 to 2016–17) : C. J. Green
Randal Green (1990–91 to 1993–94) : R. J. Green
Norman Gregg (1912–13 to 1914–15) : N. M. Gregg
Arthur Gregory (1880–81 to 1888–89) : A. H. Gregory
Charles Gregory (1870–71 to 1871–72) : C. S. Gregory
Charles Gregory (1898–99 to 1907–08) : C. W. Gregory
Dave Gregory (1866–67 to 1882–83) : D. W. Gregory
Jack Gregory (1920–21 to 1928–29) : J. M. Gregory
Ned Gregory (1862–63 to 1877–78) : E. J. Gregory
Syd Gregory (1889–90 to 1911–12) : S. E. Gregory
Ken Grieves (1945–46 to 1946–47) : K. J. Grieves
George Griffiths (1962–63 to 1967–68) : G. E. Griffiths
Tim Grosser (1968–69) : J. W. Grosser
Bertie Grounds (1903–04 to 1905–06) : W. T. Grounds
Kenneth Gulliver (1936–37 to 1945–46) : K. C. Gulliver
Dick Guy (1960–61 to 1968–69) : R. H. Guy
Les Gwynne (1924–25 to 1926–27) : L. W. Gwynne

H 
Brad Haddin (1998–99 to 2014–15) : B. J. Haddin
Richard Hall (1880–81 to 1883–84) : R. Hall
Walter Hand (1871–72) : W. C. Hand
David Hanlin (1948–49 to 1949–50) : D. W. Hanlin
Roger Hartigan (1903–04) : M. J. Hartigan
Thomas Hartigan (1907–08) : T. J. Hartigan
George Harvey (1909–10 to 1911–12) : G. G. Harvey
Ron Harvey (1956–57) : R. M. Harvey
Neil Harvey (1958–59 to 1962–63) : R. N. Harvey
Nathan Hauritz (2006–07 to 2011–12) : N. M. Hauritz
Greg Hayne (1999–2000) : G. J. Hayne
Martin Haywood (1991–92 to 1996–97) : M. T. Haywood
Josh Hazlewood (2008–09 to date) : J. R. Hazlewood
Gerry Hazlitt (1911–12 to 1912–13) : G. R. Hazlitt
Jamie Heath (1999–2000 to 2001–02) : J. M. Heath
Frank Henderson (1928–29 to 1929–30) : F. Henderson
Mike Hendricks (1969–70) : M. Hendricks
Hunter Hendry (1918–19 to 1923–24) : H. S. T. L. Hendry
Moisés Henriques (2006–07 to date) : M. C. Henriques
Scott Henry (2011–12 to 2014–15) : S. O. Henry
Richard Hewitt (1865–66 to 1872–73) : R. C. Hewitt
Robert Hickson (1902–03 to 1907–08) : R. N. Hickson
Hugh Hiddleston (1880–1881 to 1888–89) : H. C. S. Hiddleston
Mark Higgs (1998–99 to 2001–02) : M. A. Higgs
Andrew Hilditch (1976–77 to 1980–81) : A. M. J. Hilditch
Clement Hill (1932–33 to 1934–35) : C. J. Hill
Michael Hill (1964–65 to 1974–75) : K. M. Hill
Stanley Hill (1912–13) : S. Hill
Harry Hilliard (1855–56 to 1859–60) : H. Hilliard
Sid Hird (1931–32 to 1932–33) : S. F. Hird
John Hodgkinson (1908–09 to 1909–10) : J. E. Hodgkinson
Mick Hogg (1928–29) : G. C. H. Hogg
James Hogg (1926–27 to 1929–30) : J. E. P. Hogg
Thomas Hogue (1901––03) : T. H. Hogue
Wayne Holdsworth (1988–89 to 1996–97) : W. J. Holdsworth
Graeme Hole (1949–50) : G. B. Hole
Bob Holland (1978–79 to 1986–87) : R. G. Holland
Hal Hooker (1924–25 to 1931–32) : J. E. H. Hooker
Scott Hookey (1987–88 to 1994–95) : S. G. Hookey
Bert Hopkins (1896–97 to 1914–15) : A. J. Y. Hopkins
Herbert Hordern (1905–06 to 1912–13) : H. V. Hordern
Gordon Horsfield (1934–35 to 1941–42) : G. C. Horsfield
Dan Horsley (2000–01) : D. A. Horsley
David Hourn (1970–71 to 1981–82) : D. W. Hourn
Thomas Howard (1899–1900 to 1902–03) : T. H. Howard
George Howell (1855–56 to 1858–59) : G. Howell
William Howell (1932–33 to 1935–36) : W. H. Howell
Bill Howell (1894–95 to 1904–05) : W. P. Howell
Daniel Hughes (2012–13 to date) : D. P. Hughes
Graeme Hughes (1975–76 to 1978–79) : G. C. Hughes
Phillip Hughes (2007–08 to 2011–12) : P. J. Hughes
Ernest Hume (1895–96) : A. E. Hume
John Humphreys (1875–76) : J. Humphreys
Bill Hunt (1929–30 to 1931–32) : W. A. Hunt
Bob Hynes (1935–36 to 1938–39) : L. C. Hynes

I 
Thomas Iceton (1877–78) : T. H. Iceton
Imran Khan (1984–85) : Imran Khan
Frank Iredale (1888–89 to 1901–02) : F. A. Iredale
William Ives (1919–20 to 1921–22) : W. F. Ives

J 
Archie Jackson (1926–27 to 1930–31) : A. Jackson
Patrick Jackson (2014–15) : P. Jackson
Vic Jackson (1936–37 to 1940–41) : V. E. Jackson
Ron James (1938–39 to 1950–51) : R. V. James
Ernest Jansan (1899–1900 to 1903–04) : E. W. Jansan
Phil Jaques (2000–01 to 2011–12) : P. A. Jaques
Robert Jeffery (1978–79) : R. F. Jeffery
Arthur Jeffreys (1872–73) : A. F. Jeffreys
Andrew Johns (2006–07) : A. G. Johns
Francis Johnson (1903–04 to 1908–09) : F. B. Johnson
Aubrey Johnston (1904–05) : A. E. Johnston
Clive Johnston (1949–50 to 1957–58) : C. W. Johnston
David Johnston (1977–78 to 1981–82) : D. A. H. Johnston
Trent Johnston (1998–99 to 1999–2000) : D. T. Johnston
Frederick Johnston (1946–47 to 1950–51) : F. B. Johnston 
Neil Jones (1994–95 to 1996–97) : N. R. Jones
Andrew Jones (1987–88 to 1988–89) : R. A. Jones
Sidney Jones (1862–63 to 1869–70) : S. Jones
Sammy Jones (1880–81 to 1894–95) : S. P. Jones
Frank Jordan (1927–28 to 1928–29) : F. S. Jordan
Joel Joseph (1889–90) : J. P. Joseph

K 
Simon Katich (2002–03 to 2011–12) : S. M. Katich
Simon Keen (2008–09 to 2009–10) : S. J. C. Keen 
Charlie Kelleway (1907–08 to 1928–29) : C. Kelleway
Charles Kellick (1865–66 to 1872–73) : C. M. Kellick
James Kellick (1868–69) : J. Kellick
James Kelly (1894–95 to 1904–05) : J. J. Kelly
Peter Kelly (1962–63) : P. C. Kelly
Justin Kenny (1988–89 to 1990–91) : J. D. Kenny
Alexander Kermode (1901–02) : A. Kermode
Anthony Kershler (1994–95 to 1995–96) : A. J. Kershler
John Kettle (1859–60 to 1861–62) : J. L. Kettle
Percy King (1919–20) : P. M. King
John Kinloch (1858–59 to 1861–62) : J. Kinloch
Alan Kippax (1918–19 to 1935–36) : A. F. Kippax
Ronald Kissell (1946–47 to 1951–52) : R. K. Kissell
Jason Krejza (2004–05 to 2006–07) : J. J. Krejza

L 
Josh Lalor (2011–12 to 2015–16) : J. K. Lalor
Grant Lambert (2001–02 to 2009–10) : G. M. Lambert
Ossie Lambert (1950–51 to 1956–57) : O. Lambert
William Lampe (1927–28 to 1928–29) : W. H. W. Lampe
Paddy Lane (1907–08 to 1912–13) : J. B. Lane
Tim Lang (2006–07) : T. E. Lang
Nick Larkin (2014–15 to date) : N. C. R. Larkin
Charles Lawes (1924–25) : C. H. W. Lawes
Charles Lawrence (1862–63 to 1869–70) : C. Lawrence
Geoff Lawson (1977–78 to 1991–92) : G. F. Lawson
Leonard Leabeater (1929–30 to 1931–32) : L. R. Leabeater
Brett Lee (1997–98 to 2010–11) : B. Lee
Shane Lee (1992–93 to 2001–02) : S. Lee
Terry Lee (1962–63 to 1967–68) : T. H. Lee
Jay Lenton (2015–16) : J. S. Lenton
Peter Leslie (1965–66 to 1968–69) : P. G. Leslie
Oswald Lewis (1856–57 to 1860–61) : O. H. Lewis
Thomas Lewis (1856–57 to 1859–60) : T. H. Lewis
Ray Lindwall (1941–42 to 1953–54) : R. R. Lindwall
Ray Little (1934–35 to 1935–36) : R. C. J. Little
Bruce Livingston (1956–57) : B. A. L. Livingston
Jock Livingston (1941–42 to 1946–47) : L. Livingston
Roy Loder (1926–27 to 1928–29) : R. R. Loder
Roy Lonergan (1935–36) : A. R. Lonergan
Edmund Long (1911–12) : E. J. Long
William Lough (1906–07) : W. D. Lough
Hammy Love (1920–21 to 1932–33) : H. S. B. Love
Walter Loveridge (1902–03) : W. D. Loveridge
Eric Lukeman (1946–47 to 1949–50) : E. W. Lukeman
Ginty Lush (1933–34 to 1946–47) : J. G. Lush
Nathan Lyon (2013–14 to date) : N. M. Lyon

M 
Charlie Macartney (1905–06 to 1926–27) : C. G. Macartney
Stuart MacGill (1996–97 to 2007–08) : S. C. G. MacGill
Sunny Jim Mackay (1902–03 to 1905–06) : J. R. M. Mackay
Kerry Mackay (1970–71 to 1974–75) : K. Mackay
Alick Mackenzie (1888–89 to 1906–07) : A. C. K. Mackenzie
William Macnish (1862–63) : W. G. Macnish 
Herbert MacPherson (1893–94 to 1894–95) : H. J. K. MacPherson
Bobby Madden (1949–50 to 1959–60) : R. H. Madden
Nic Maddinson (2010–11 to date) : N. J. Maddinson
Greg Mail (1999–2000 to 2008–09) : G. J. Mail
Arthur Mailey (1912–13 to 1929–30) : A. A. Mailey
Frederick Mair (1933–34 to 1937–38) : F. Mair
William Makin (1910–11) : W. Makin
Peter Maloney (1976–77) : P. I. Maloney
Manjot Singh (2013–14) : Manjot Singh
Hugh Marjoribanks (1958–59) : H. L. Marjoribanks
Alec Marks (1928–29 to 1936–37) : A. E. Marks
Lynn Marks (1962–63 to 1968–69) : L. A. Marks
Neil Marks (1958–59 to 1959–60) : N. G. Marks
Phil Marks (1983–84 to 1989–90) : P. H. Marks
Alfred Marr (1882–83 to 1890–91) : A. P. Marr
Jack Marsh (1900–01 to 1902–03) : J. Marsh
Hugh Martin (1971–72) : H. Martin
John Martin (1966–67 to 1969–70) : J. F. Martin
Johnny Martin (1956–57 to 1967–68) : J. W. Martin
Hugh Massie (1877–78 to 1887–88) : H. H. Massie
Jack Massie (1910–11 to 1913–14) : R. J. A. Massie
Adam Mather (1885–86 to 1886–87) : A. Mather
Greg Matthews (1982–83 to 1997–98) : G. R. J. Matthews
Neil Maxwell (1993–94 to 1995–96) : N. D. Maxwell
Alexander Mayes (1924–25) : Alexander Dunbar Aitken Mayes
Arthur McBeath (1899–1900 to 1903–04) : A. McBeath
Stan McCabe (1928–29 to 1941–42) : S. J. McCabe
Victor McCaffery (1938–39) : V. W. McCaffery
Bede McCauley (1937–38 to 1938–39) : B. V. McCauley
William McCloy (1918–19) : W. S. S. McCloy
Colin McCool (1939–40 to 1940–41) : C. L. McCool
Rick McCosker (1973–74 to 1983–84) : R. B. McCosker
Barney McCoy (1920–21 to 1923–24) : B. L. McCoy
Brendon McCullum (2008–09) : B. B. McCullum
Percy McDonnell (1885–86 to 1891–92) : P. S. McDonnell
Eric McElhone (1910–11 to 1911–12) : F. E. McElhone
Alan McGilvray (1933–34 to 1936–37) : A. D. McGilvray
Wally McGlinchey (1885–86 to 1892–93) : W. W. McGlinchey
Glenn McGrath (1992–93 to 2007–08) : G. D. McGrath
Harold McGuirk (1926–27) : H. V. McGuirk
Leo McGuirk (1930–31) : L. D. McGuirk
William McIntyre (1905–06 to 1906–07) : W. R. McIntyre
Cecil McKew (1911–12 to 1913–14) : C. G. McKew
Tom McKibbin (1894–95 to 1898–99) : T. R. McKibbin
John McKone (1855–56 to 1857–58) : J. J. McKone
Greg McLay (1990–91) : G. F. McLay
Brad McNamara (1989–90 to 1999–2000) : B. E. McNamara
Ray McNamee (1926–27 to 1928–29) : R. L. A. McNamee
Keith McPhillamy (1904–05) : K. McPhillamy
Frederick Middleton (1905–06 to 1909–10) : F. S. Middleton
David Miller (1893–94) : D. L. Miller
Keith Miller (1947–48 to 1955–56) : K. R. Miller
Noel Miller (1935–36) : N. K. Miller
Geoff Milliken (1989–90 to 1991–92) : G. S. Milliken
John Mills (1857–58) : J. Mills
Leslie Minnett (1907–08 to 1914–15) : L. A. Minnett
Roy Minnett (1906–07 to 1914–15) : R. B. Minnett
Rupert Minnett (1909–10 to 1914–15) : R. V. Minnett
James Minter (1938–39) : E. J. Minter
Frank Misson (1958–59 to 1963–64) : F. M. Misson
David Moore (1986–87) : D. J. A. Moore
George Moore (1870–71 to 1872–73) : G. Moore
Stanley Moore (1912–13) : G. S. Moore
Jemmy Moore (1861–62) : J. Moore
Leon Moore (1892–93 to 1894–95) : L. D. Moore
Bill Moore (1893–94) : W. H. Moore
Ian Moran (2005–06) : I. A. Moran
George Morgan (1874–75) : G. Morgan
Gordon Morgan (1921–22 to 1928–29) : J. G. Morgan
Jack Moroney (1945–46 to 1951–52) : J. Moroney
Arthur Morris (1940–41 to 1954–55) : A. R. Morris
John Morris (1858–59) : J. H. Morris
Norman Morris (1928–29) : N. O. Morris
Charles Morrissey (1924–25 to 1925–26) : C. V. Morrissey
Henry Moses (1881–82 to 1894–95) : H. Moses
Ron Moss (1948–49) : R. B. Moss
Harold Mudge (1935–36 to 1939–40) : H. Mudge
Wayne Mulherin (1983–84) : W. M. Mulherin
Des Mullarkey (1923–24) : D. A. Mullarkey
Arthur Munn (1912–13 to 1913–14) : A. R. Munn
Billy Murdoch (1875–76 to 1893–94) : W. L. Murdoch
James Murphy (1933–34 to 1938–39) : J. J. Murphy
Richard Murray (1855–56 to 1859–60) : R. Murray

N 
Arjun Nair (2015–16 to date) : A. J. Nair
Don Nash (1999–2000 to 2003–04) : D. A. Nash
Peter Nevill (2008–09 to date) : P. M. Nevill
Henry Newcombe (1860–61 to 1862–63) : H. C. E. Newcombe
Andrew Newell (1889–90 to 1899–1900) : A. L. Newell
Percy Newton (1907–08) : P. A. Newton
Charles Nicholls (1926–27 to 1928–29) : C. O. Nicholls
Arthur Nichols (1908–09) : A. J. Nichols
Matthew Nicholson (2003–04 to 2007–08) : M. J. Nicholson
Steve Nikitaras (1996–97) : S. Nikitaras
Ted Noble (1893–94) : E. G. Noble
Monty Noble (1893–94 to 1919–20) : M. A. Noble
David Noonan (1895–96) : D. J. Noonan
Rex Norman (1918–19 to 1919–20) : H. R. C. Norman
Otto Nothling (1922–23 to 1924–25) : O. E. Nothling
Thomas Nunn (1880–81 to 1884–85) : T. Nunn
Richard Nutt (1931–32 to 1932–33) : R. N. Nutt

O 
James Oatley (1865–66 to 1868–69) : J. N. Oatley
Aaron O'Brien (2001–02 to 2007–08) : A. W. O'Brien
Charles O'Brien (1945–46) : C. J. O'Brien
Ernest O'Brien (1926–27 to 1927–28) : E. F. O'Brien
Leslie O'Brien (1937–38 to 1938–39) : L. J. O'Brien
Jack O'Connor (1904–05 to 1905–06) : J. D. A. O'Connor
David Ogilvy (1885–86 to 1886–87) : D. S. Ogilvy
William O'Hanlon (1884–85 to 1888–89) : W. J. O'Hanlon
Steve O'Keefe (2005–06 to date) : S. N. J. O'Keefe
Frank O'Keeffe (1919–20 to 1920–21) : F. A. O'Keeffe
Kerry O'Keeffe (1968–69 to 1979–80) : K. J. O'Keeffe
Bert Oldfield (1919–20 to 1937–38) : W. A. S. Oldfield
Charles Oliver (1865–66 to 1872–73) : C. N. J. Oliver
Mark O'Neill (1982–83 to 1990–91) : M. D. O'Neill
Norm O'Neill (1955–56 to 1966–67) : N. C. L. O'Neill
Jim O'Regan (1957–58) : J. B. O'Regan
John O'Reilly (1953–54 to 1959–60) : J. W. O'Reilly
Bill O'Reilly (1927–28 to 1945–46) : W. J. O'Reilly
Robert Osborne (1924–25 to 1926–27) : R. H. Osborne
Kerry Owen (1965–66) : K. A. Owen

P 
James Packman (2004–05) : J. R. Packman
Alfred Park (1861–62 to 1868–69) : A. L. Park
Thomas Parsonage (1932–33) : T. G. Parsonage
Len Pascoe (1974–75 to 1983–84) : L. S. Pascoe
Charles Patrick (1893–94) : C. W. Patrick
Kurtis Patterson (2011–12 to date) : K. R. Patterson
Mark Patterson (1994–95 to 1995–96) : M. W. Patterson
Mick Pawley (1969–70 to 1973–74) : M. B. Pawley
Reginald Pearce (1952–53) : R. M. Pearce
Percival Penman (1904–05 to 1905–06) : A. P. Penman
Cec Pepper (1938–39 to 1940–41) : C. G. Pepper
Jack Pettiford (1946–47 to 1947–48) : J. Pettiford
Matthew Phelps (1998–99 to 2005–06) : M. J. Phelps
Norbert Phillips (1922–23 to 1929–30) : N. E. Phillips
Ray Phillips (1978–79) : R. B. Phillips
Stephen Phillips (2005–06) : S. J. Phillips
Peter Philpott (1954–55 to 1966–67) : P. I. Philpott
Michael Pierce (1892–93 to 1893–94) : M. Pierce
Nathan Pilon (2000–01 to 2003–04) : N. S. Pilon
Colin Pinch (1949–50) : C. J. Pinch
Walter Pite (1901–02 to 1914–15) : W. E. Pite
William Pocock (1872–73) : W. J. Pocock
Les Poidevin (1895–96 to 1904–05) : L. O. S. Poidevin
Roland Pope (1884–85) : R. J. Pope
George Powell (1941–42 to 1948–49) : G. Powell
Jerry Powell (1872–73 to 1884–85) : T. Powell
Bert Pratten (1913–14 to 1914–15) : H. G. Pratten
Ward Prentice (1912–13 to 1920–21) : W. S. Prentice
David Pryor (1895–96) : D. G. Pryor
Austin Punch (1919–20 to 1928–29) : A. T. E. Punch
Leslie Pye (1896–97 to 1905–06) : L. W. Pye

Q 

Karl Quist (1899–1900) : K. H. Quist

R 
James Randell (1909–10 to 1924–25) : J. A. Randell
Andrew Ratcliffe (1913–14 to 1928–29) : A. T. Ratcliffe
Mark Ray (1981–82) : M. Ray
Sidney Redgrave (1904–05 to 1906–07) : J. S. Redgrave
William Rees (1856–57) : W. G. Rees
Douglas Reid (1908–09 to 1909–10) : D. C. Reid
David Renneberg (1964–65 to 1970–71) : D. A. Renneberg
Brian Rhodes (1971–72) : B. L. Rhodes
Corey Richards (1995–96 to 2005–06) : C. J. Richards
Charles Richardson (1886–87 to 1894–95) : C. A. Richardson
George Richardson (1859–60 to 1860–61) : G. B. Richardson
Len Richardson (1975–76) : L. M. Richardson
William Richardson (1887–88 to 1895–96) : W. A. Richardson
Frank Ridge (1895–96) : F. M. Ridge
Steve Rixon (1974–75 to 1987–88) : S. J. Rixon
Andy Roberts (1976–77) : A. M. E. Roberts
Kevin Roberts (1994–95 to 1997–98) : K. J. Roberts
William Roberts (1880–81) : W. Roberts
Gavin Robertson (1987–88 to 1999–2000) : G. R. Robertson
Henry Robinson (1889–90 to 1892–93) : H. J. W. Robinson
Ray Robinson (1934–35 to 1939–40) : R. H. Robinson
William Robison (1893–94) : W. C. Robison
Owen Rock (1924–25 to 1925–26) : H. O. Rock
Grant Roden (2005–06) : G. W. Roden
John Rogers (1968–69 to 1969–70) : W. J. Rogers
Ben Rohrer (2006–07 to 2016–17) : B. J. Rohrer
Mick Roper (1939–40) : A. W. Roper
Gordon Rorke (1957–58 to 1963–64) : G. F. Rorke
Marshall Rosen (1971–72 to 1975–76) : M. F. Rosen
Barry Rothwell (1963–64 to 1968–69) : B. A. Rothwell
Raymond Rowe (1932–33 to 1933–34) : R. C. Rowe
Greg Rowell (1989–90 to 1990–91) : G. J. Rowell
Frank Rowland (1924–25) : F. W. Rowland
Francis Rowley (1860–61 to 1861–62) : F. Rowley
Robert Roxby (1953–54) : R. C. Roxby
Graeme Rummans (1997–98 to 2001–02) : G. C. Rummans
Barney Russell (1920–21 to 1921–22) : B. L. Russell
Gregory Ryan (1934–35) : G. W. Ryan

S 
Edward Saddler (1855––62) : E. Saddler
Ron Saggers (1939–40 to 1950–51) : R. A. Saggers
Andrew Sainsbury (1998–99) : A. J. Sainsbury
Benjamin Salmon (1924–25 to 1931–32) : B. M. Salmon
Edward Samuels (1859–60) : E. Samuels
Gurinder Sandhu (2012–13 to date) : G. S. Sandhu
Warren Saunders (1955–56 to 1964–65) : W. J. Saunders
Harry Savage (1921–22) : H. M. Savage
Albert Scanes (1921–22 to 1927–28) : A. E. Scanes
Ted Scanlan (1877–78) : E. Scanlan
John Scott (1908–09 to 1924–25) : J. D. Scott
Barry Scott (1940–41) : R. B. Scott
Wayne Seabrook (1984–85 to 1985–86) : W. J. S. Seabrook
Edward Seale (1877–78 to 1878–79) : E. H. Seale
James Searle (1888–89 to 1893–94) : J. Searle
Dudley Seddon (1926–27 to 1928–29) : C. D. Seddon
Morris Shea (1895–96) : M. Shea
James Shepherd (1889–90) : J. Shepherd
Ned Sheridan (1867–68 to 1878–79) : E. O. Sheridan
Bert Shortland (1911–12) : H. Shortland
Arthur Simmons (1934–35) : A. H. Simmons
Craig Simmons (2005–06 to 2006–07) : C. J. Simmons
Charles Simpson (1909–10 to 1910–11) : C. E. Simpson
Bob Simpson (1952–53 to 1977–78) : R. B. Simpson
William Sinclair (1867–68) : W. F. Sinclair
Clive Single (1912–13) : C. V. Single
Stan Sismey (1938–39 to 1950–51) : S. G. Sismey
John Skilbeck (1981–82 to 1982–83) : A. J. Skilbeck
Michael Slater (1991–92 to 2003–04) : M. J. Slater
Steve Small (1978–79 to 1992–93) : S. M. Small
Daniel Smith (2004–05 to 2011–12) : D. L. R. Smith
Dwayne Smith (2009–10) : D. R. Smith
Graham Smith (1985–86 to 1989–90) : G. L. Smith
James Smith (1909–10) : J. H. Smith
Steven B. Smith (1981–82 to 1988–89) : S. B. Smith
Steven P.D. Smith (2007–08 to date) : S. P. D. Smith
Cyril Solomon (1931–32 to 1939–40) : C. M. Solomon
William Somerville (2014–15 to date) : W. E. R. Somerville
Fred Spofforth (1874–75 to 1884–85) : F. R. Spofforth
Graham Spring (1982–83 to 1983–84) : G. A. Spring
George Stack (1866–67 to 1868–69) : G. B. Stack
Walter Stack (1909–10 to 1912–13) : W. J. Stack
Harold Stapleton (1940–41) : H. V. Stapleton
Mitchell Starc (2008–09 to date) : M. A. Starc
Bob Steele (1926–27 to 1927–28) : H. C. Steele
Tony Steele (1968–69 to 1970–71) : J. A. Steele
Paul Stepto (1986–87) : P. D. Stepto
John Stevens (1970–71) : J. G. Stevens
Gordon Stewart (1930–31 to 1932–33) : G. L. Stewart
Jamie Stewart (1999–2000 to 2000–01) : J. Stewart
William Still (1856–57 to 1858–59) : W. C. Still
Charlie Stobo (2016–17 to date) : C. H. Stobo
Richard Stobo (1988–1989 to 1992–93) : R. M. Stobo
Anthony Stuart (1994–95 to 1998–99) : A. M. Stuart
Alfred Sullivan (1904–05 to 1906–07) : A. E. Sullivan
James Suppel (1946–47) : J. T. Suppel

T 
Brian Taber (1964–65 to 1973–74) : H. B. Taber
David Taylor (1907–08) : D. Taylor
Johnny Taylor (1913–14 to 1926–27) : J. M. Taylor
Joseph Taylor (1911–12 to 1913–14) : J. S. Taylor
Mark Taylor (1985–86 to 1998–99) : M. A. Taylor
Peter Taylor (1985–86 to 1989–90) : P. L. Taylor
Ross Taylor (1959–60) : R. S. Taylor
Allen Thatcher (1920–21 to 1923–24) : A. N. Thatcher
Henry Theak (1929–30 to 1934–35) : H. J. T. Theak
Grahame Thomas (1957–58 to 1965–66) : G. Thomas
Goldie Thomas (1909–10) : M. W. G. Thomas
Carvick Thompson (1869–70) : C. D. Thompson
Kerry Thompson (1977–78) : K. W. Thompson
Scott Thompson (1993–94 to 2000–01) : S. M. Thompson
Jeff Thomson (1972–73 to 1973–74) : J. R. Thomson
Nat Thomson (1857–58 to 1879–80) : N. F. D. Thomson
Dominic Thornely (2001–02 to 2010–11) : D. J. Thornely
Edwin Tindall (1874–75 to 1880–81) : E. Tindall
John Tooher (1875–76) : J. A. Tooher
Peter Toohey (1974–75 to 1983–84) : P. M. Toohey
Ernie Toshack (1945–46 to 1949–50) : E. R. H. Toshack
Claude Tozer (1910–11 to 1919–20) : C. J. Tozer
Jack Treanor (1954–55 to 1956–57) : J. C. Treanor
Chris Tremain (2011–12 to 2012–13) : C. P. Tremain
Ted Trenerry (1919–20 to 1920–21) : E. Trenerry
Bill Trenerry (1920–21 to 1924–25) : W. L. Trenerry
Geoffrey Trueman (1951–52 to 1953–54) : G. S. Trueman
Victor Trumper (1894–95 to 1913–14) : V. T. Trumper
Victor Trumper Jr (1940–41) : V. Trumper
Adrian Tucker (1989–90 to 2003–04) : A. E. Tucker
Darren Tucker (1989–90) : D. C. Tucker
Rod Tucker (1985–86 to 1987–88) : R. J. Tucker
William Tunks (1855–56) : W. Tunks
Alan Turner (1968–69 to 1977–78) : A. Turner
Charles Turner (1882–83 to 1909–10) : C. T. B. Turner
Dale Turner (2001–02) : D. A. Turner
Ernie Tweeddale (1925–26) : E. R. Tweeddale
Twopenny (1869–70) : Twopenny

U 

Param Uppal (2017–18) : P. Uppal
Usman Khawaja (2007–08 to 2011–12) : Usman Khawaja

V 

Brett van Deinsen (1999–2000 to 2001–02) : B. P. van Deinsen
Timm van der Gugten (2011–12) : T. van der Gugten
Leonard Vaughan (1925–26) : L. J. Vaughan
Robert Vaughan (1855–56 to 1857–58) : R. Vaughan
Bob Vidler (1977–78 to 1978–79) : R. T. Vidler

W 
Mick Waddy (1902–03 to 1910–11) : E. F. Waddy
Gar Waddy (1896–97 to 1920–21) : E. L. Waddy
Frank Wade (1895–96) : F. H. Wade
Ike Wales (1886–87 to 1893–94) : I. Wales
Sydney Walford (1892–93 to 1895–96) : S. R. Walford
Alan Walker (1948–49 to 1952–53) : A. K. Walker
Lyall Wall (1914–15 to 1924–25) : J. C. L. S. Wall
Walter Walmsley (1945–46) : W. T. Walmsley
Jack Walsh (1939–40) : J. E. Walsh
Francis Walters (1895–96) : F. H. Walters
Doug Walters (1962–63 to 1980–81) : K. D. Walters
Edward Ward (1856–57 to 1861–62) : E. W. Ward
Maxwell Ward (1936–37) : M. J. Ward
David Warner (2006–07 to date) : D. A. Warner
John Watkins (1971–72 to 1972–73) : J. R. Watkins
Bertie Watson (1927–28) : B. F. Watson
Graeme Watson (1976–77) : G. D. Watson
Greg Watson (1977–78 to 1978–79) : G. G. Watson
Shane Watson (2010–11 to 2015–16) : S. R. Watson
William Watson (1910–11) : W. Watson
Bill Watson (1953–54 to 1960–61) : W. J. Watson
Dean Waugh (1995–96 to 1996–97) : D. P. Waugh
Mark Waugh (1985–86 to 2003–04) : M. E. Waugh
Russell Waugh (1960–61) : R. F. Waugh
Steve Waugh (1984–85 to 2003–04) : S. R. Waugh
Stewart Wearne (1880–81 to 1887–88) : W. S. Wearne
Stuart Webster (1972–73 to 1977–78) : S. E. Webster
Dirk Wellham (1980–81 to 1987–88) : D. M. Wellham
Wally Wellham (1959–60) : W. A. Wellham
Arthur Wells (1920–21 to 1924–25) : A. P. Wells
Harry Whiddon (1907–08) : H. Whiddon
Alfred White (1905–06 to 1908–09) : A. B. S. White
Jim White (1925–26) : A. H. E. White
Ted White (1934–35 to 1938–39) : E. C. S. White
Steve Whitfield (1988–89) : S. B. J. Whitfield
Albert Whiting (1886–87) : A. W. H. Whiting
Mike Whitney (1980–81 to 1993–94) : M. R. Whitney
William Whitting (1905–06) : W. C. Whitting
Bill Whitty (1907–08) : W. J. Whitty
Vaughan Williams (2001–02) : V. M. Williams
Joseph Wilson (1891–92) : J. C. Wilson
John Wilson (1968–69 to 1971–72) : J. W. Wilson
John Wood (1887–88) : J. R. Wood
William Wood (1874–75) : W. Wood
Gordon Woolmer (1945–46) : G. R. Woolmer
Charles Wordsworth (1907–08) : C. W. Wordsworth
Alan Wyatt (1956–57 to 1958–59) : A. E. Wyatt

Y 

Walter Yeates (1949–50) : G. W. C. Yeates
George Youill (1889–90 to 1895–96) : G. J. Youill
Jason Young (1994–95) : J. C. Young

Z 
Liam Zammit (2003–04) : L. A. Zammit
Adam Zampa (2012–13) : A. Zampa

References

 *
Cricket
New